Mount Chown is Alberta's 36th highest peak. It is named after the Reverend Samuel Dwight Chown. It is located in the northwest corner of Jasper National Park on the border with the Willmore Wilderness Park. It lies between the Chown and Resthaven Glaciers.

See also
Alberta's Rockies
List of Ultras of North America

References

Chown
Alberta's Rockies